Pure Smokey is Smokey Robinson's second post-Miracles album, released in 1974. It features the single "Virgin Man." Several songs were written by Robinson with fellow Miracle Marv Tarplin, who left the group a year after Robinson's departure to join him in California and assist him in his solo projects.

Track listing
All tracks are produced by Smokey Robinson; except "A Tattoo".

All tracks arranged by Russ Turner, Gene Page and Smokey Robinson; except where indicated.

"It's Her Turn to Live" (Robinson, Marvin Tarplin) - 3:15
"The Love Between Me and My Kids" (Robinson) - 2:52
"Asleep on My Love" (Robinson, Tarplin) - 3:58
"I Am I Am" (Robinson) - 3:53
"Just Passing Through" (Tarplin, Janie Bradford, Al Cleveland) - 3:17
"Virgin Man" (Robinson, Rose Ella Jones) - 5:07
"She's Only a Baby Herself" (Robinson) - 2:47
"Fulfill Your Need" (Robinson, Tarplin, Pamela Moffett) - 2:50
"A Tattoo" (Robinson) - 4:30

"I Am, I Am" arranged by Smokey Robinson and Gene Page

"A Tattoo" produced and arranged by Smokey Robinson and Willie Hutch

Personnel
Smokey Robinson – vocals, arranger
Gene Page – arranger
Bobbye Hall – percussion
Henry Davis – bass guitar
Jeffrey Osborne – drums
Melvin "Wah Wah" Ragin – guitar
Russ Turner – keyboards, arranger
Marvin Tarplin – guitar
Technical
Bruce Ellison, Jim Hilton, Larry Miles, Russ Terrana, Tom Knox - recording engineers
Russ Terrana - mixing engineer
Robert Gleason - design
Jim Britt - photography

References

1974 albums
Smokey Robinson albums
Albums arranged by Gene Page
Albums produced by Smokey Robinson
Tamla Records albums